Malshree or Malashree Dhun or Malshree Dhoon (Nepal Bhasa: मालश्री धून) is a Hindu Newa artform in which musicians perform devotional music, based on classical raga and taal system. The dhun is incorporated into mainstream Nepalese music as the music of Dashain. It is the tune that announces that Dashain, the biggest Hindu festival of Nepal, has arrived. Malashree dhun is one of the oldest surviving devotional musics of Nepal, with its origin in the 17th century. The Malshree dhun originally belongs to the Newari culture from the Kathmandu valley, and it’s a  folk music of Newari culture which later on got amalgamated with the large Nepali culture and has become a traditional music of the biggest festival of Nepal, Dashain.

History
Classic devotional music has been in existence in Nepal for more than a thousand years. The time period between 11th to 17th century saw an increase in literary activity in Kathmandu. Numerous devotional music, dances, and plays have been found from this era. Most experts believe that the literary development during this era culminated in the development of Newa music form.

The earliest treatise on Malshree dhun found till date is a book in Nepal Bhasa called Sangit Chandra. The book was written as an appendix to Natya Shastra by the king of Bhaktapur Jagat Jyoti Malla and his minister Vanshamani Ojha. The book elaborates on Bharata Muni's Natya Shastra and Abhinavagupta's Abhinavabharati. This was followed by Gayanlochan, written during the reign of Jitamitra Malla. Gayanlochan focuses more on introduction to raga (and raginis), their characteristics, and performance.

Performance
The sitar, the tabla, the taa and the dhimay are the mainstays of the spiritually uplifting dhun, with some other instruments like the sarangi and flute taking a more subdued role. The melody is maintained by the sitar. The Malshree music is performed according to a fixed schedule, which is during the Dashain festival. There are specific pieces of music which are played during the specific season, specific day of the week and specific hours of the day.

Seasons, their festivals and music accompanying them are as follows

This melodious Malshree or Dashain dhun is played using different musical instruments but the key instruments are sitar and tabla. These two instruments are beautifully combined with the notations that have given birth to this melodious music. Nowadays we can find people using different instruments to play this music, like guitars, drums just to name a few. The music is so freshening and joyful that takes everyone into a mood of celebration which is the beautiful part of this melodious dhun. Therefore, Dashain dhun in Malshree dhun is a beautiful music that is very much important for the most happening and awaited festival of Nepal, Dashain. The different tabs for the Malshree dhun are as follows-

See also
 Newa music
List of Nepali musical instruments

References

External links
 Malshree Dhun
 British Library clip of Dapha (1955-56)
 Newari Music - Mwe Dyahlhaygu 1952
 Asan Dapha Khala performing Dapha
 Kathmandu, a valley fertile for music (Himal magazine)

Nepalese musical genres
Nepalese songs